Mechanix may refer to:

"The Mechanix" (aka "Mechanix"), a song written by Dave Mustaine and also performed separately by Metallica and Megadeth
Mechanix (album), a heavy metal album by UFO originally released in 1982
Mechanix Illustrated, an American magazine published during the 20th century 
Mechanix Wear, a manufacturer of high performance work gloves and other clothing